John le Sezevaux was one of two Member of Parliament for the constituency of York along with Gilbert de Arnald in the second Parliament of 1297.

Life and politics

John's family came from the small Wold town of Thixendale from which his last name is derived from a French form of the Latin name of that place, Sexdecum Vallibus. He first represented York in the Parliament of 1297 and then again in 1304 and 1306. He first represented York in the Parliament of 1297 and then again in 1304 and 1306 (though recorded as John de Sezevaux).

References

Politicians from York
Members of the Parliament of England for constituencies in Yorkshire
English MPs 1297
People from Ryedale (district)